Rhododendron glanduliferum (大果杜鹃) is a rhododendron species native to  northeastern Yunnan, China, where it grows at altitudes of . The flowers are white.

References
 Franchet, Bull. Soc. Bot. France. 33: 231. 1886.

glanduliferum